Chewing Gum is a British television sitcom created and written by Michaela Coel, based on her 2012 play Chewing Gum Dreams. It stars Coel and Robert Lonsdale. Set in London, the show follows 24-year-old shop assistant Tracey Gordon, a restricted, religious virgin, who wants to have sex and learn more about the world. The show earned Coel the BAFTA for Best Female Performance in a Comedy Programme and Breakthrough Talent.

The first series debuted on E4 on 13 October 2015 and on Netflix in the United States on 31 October 2016. The series was removed from Netflix in April 2020 and became available on HBO Max in February 2021.

Background
In August 2014, Channel 4 announced that Coel was to star in and write a new sitcom called Chewing Gum, inspired by her play Chewing Gum Dreams. "C4 Comedy Blaps" were released as teasers in September 2014, and the series began on E4 in October 2015. Her performance earned her the British Academy Television Award for Best Female Comedy Performance in 2016; she also won a BAFTA for Breakthrough Talent for writing the show. Chewing Gum received overwhelmingly positive reviews.

Series one premiered on 6 October 2015 until 10 November 2015. On 3 December 2015, E4 ordered a second series; it began broadcasting on 12 January 2017.

In April 2017, it was announced by Channel 4 that the show would not be returning for a third series. However, in November 2017, Coel stated via Twitter that she intended to create a third series at some point in the future. In November 2018, Coel made another statement via Twitter confirming that the show wouldn't return for a third series.

Filming locations have included West London Film Studios and the Andover Estate in Holloway, North London.

Cast
 Michaela Coel as Tracey Gordon
 Robert Lonsdale as Connor Jones
 John MacMillan as Ronald, Tracey's boyfriend for six years
 Tanya Franks as Mandy, Connor's mother
 Danielle Isaie as Candice, Tracey's best friend
 Kadiff Kirwan as Aaron, Candice's boyfriend
 Susan Wokoma as Cynthia, Tracey's naive sister
 Shola Adewusi as Joy, Tracey and Cynthia's religious mother
 Maggie Steed as Esther, Candice's grandmother
 Olisa Odele as Ola
 Sarah Hoare as Karly Raven
 Abby Rakic-Platt as Kristy Raven

Guest
 Cynthia Erivo as Magdalene (series 1)
 Jonathan Bailey as Ash (series 2)
 Vera Chok as Penelope (series 2)

Episodes

Series 1 (2015)

Series 2 (2017)

References

External links
 
 
 
 

2010s British LGBT-related comedy television series
2010s British sex comedy television series
2010s British sitcoms
2015 British television series debuts
2017 British television series endings
Black British sitcoms
E4 sitcoms
English-language television shows
Incest in television
Television series about dysfunctional families 
Television series based on plays
Television series by Fremantle (company)
Television shows filmed in the United Kingdom
Television shows set in London
Virginity in television